WKS Śląsk Wrocław is a professional men's handball club based in Wrocław in southwestern Poland, founded in 1955. The club currently plays in Central League, the second tier competition of Polish handball. Fifteen times Polish Champion, seven–time Polish Cup winner, and a silver medallist of the EHF Champions League (1978). One of the most titled Polish handball clubs.

Honours

Domestic
 Polish Superliga
Winners (15): 1957–58, 1960–61, 1961–62, 1962–63, 1964–65, 1966–67, 1971–72, 1972–73, 1973–74, 1974–75, 1975–76, 1976–77, 1977–78, 1981–82, 1996–97

 Polish Cup
Winners (7): 1958–59, 1964–65, 1968–69, 1975–76, 1980–81, 1981–82, 1988–89

International
 EHF Champions League
Silver (1): 1977–78

References

External links
 Official website 

Polish handball clubs
Sport in Wrocław
Handball clubs established in 1955
1955 establishments in Poland
Handball